The Bagå Formation is a geological formation dating to around 176 to 170 million years ago, in the Early and Late Jurassic. It is located on the island of Bornholm, Denmark.

Fossil content

Ichnofossils

Sauropoda

Ornithischians

See also 
 List of fossiliferous stratigraphic units in Denmark
 Drzewica Formation

References

Bibliography 
 Bonde, N. (2012). "Danish Dinosaurs: A Review". In Godefroit, P. Bernissart Dinosaurs. Indiana University Press. pp. 435-449
 Mehlquist, K.; Larsson, L.M.; Vajda, V. (2009) "A Jurassic (Pliensbachian) flora from Bornholm, Denmark - a study of historic plant-fossil collection at Lund University, Sweden". GEF. 131:1. 137-146

Further reading 
 E. B. Koppelhus and D. J. Batten. 1992. Megaspore assemblages from the Jurassic and lowermost Cretaceous of Bornholm, Denmark. DGU, Danmarks Geologiske Undersogelse, Serie A 32:1-81

Geologic formations of Denmark
Jurassic System of Europe
Jurassic Denmark
Hettangian Stage
Sinemurian Stage
Pliensbachian Stage
Toarcian Stage
Aalenian Stage
Bathonian Stage
Shale formations
Sandstone formations
Coal formations
Coal in Denmark
Formations